Look Homeward, Angel is a 1957 stage play by the playwright Ketti Frings. The play is based on Thomas Wolfe's 1929 largely autobiographical novel of the same title.

Production
Look Homeward, Angel opened on Broadway at the Ethel Barrymore Theatre on November 28, 1957, and ran for a total of 564 performances, closing on April 4, 1959. Directed by George Roy Hill, the cast starred Jo Van Fleet (who replaced Bette Davis during rehearsals after Davis broke her back at her home) and Anthony Perkins.

Ketti Frings won the 1958 Pulitzer Prize for Drama and the New York Drama Critics' Circle Award. The production received Tony Award nominations for Best Play; Best Actor in a Play (Hugh Griffith and Anthony Perkins); Best Actress in a Play (Jo Van Fleet); Best Scenic Design (Jo Mielziner); Best Costume Design (Motley); and Best Director (George Roy Hill).

John Drew Barrymore was to co-star with Miriam Hopkins in the tour of Look Homeward, Angel, which was set to open in Wilmington, Delaware, on October 21, 1959, but Barrymore, who was said to be suffering from a skin infection and was underweight, quit the touring company during rehearsals. He was replaced by Jonathan Bolt.

Synopsis
Look Homeward, Angel traces the coming of age of Eugene Gant, as well as the lives of his family members.  It takes place in the town of Altamont, North Carolina.  Eugene's mother, Eliza, runs a boarding house, "Dixieland", where boarders often interact with and affect the lives of the Gants.  His father, William Oliver, runs a marble sculpture shop, where his prized possession, a statue of an angel, is kept.

The play begins by showing life in the boarding house when a young woman, Laura enters and requests to stay there.  Gant enters drunk, but is eventually helped by his daughter, Helen.  The next scene sees Eugene and his brother, Ben, discussing life and love.  Eugene meets Laura, and they appear to fall in love, though Eugene lies about his age, claiming to be older.  Eliza and Gant fight over the matter of selling his shop and the angel statue.  Eliza enters the boarding house and begins arguing with Ben, cumulating in her slapping him.  The next scene, days later, sees Gant and Eugene working in his shop.  Laura enters to confront Eugene about the truth—she has lied about her age and he has as well.  Eliza enters, ready to sell Gant's shop, until he at last announces that rather than use the money for Dixieland's expenses, he would take the money, put Gene in college, and begin traveling.  Eliza rips up his check in a fit of fury and exits.  Immediately following, Ben falls ill.  He is then seen on his deathbed, where he dies.
 
The third act opens with Eugene and Laura in their bedroom.

Opening night cast

Hugh Griffith as W.O. Gant
Anthony Perkins as Eugene Gant
Jo Van Fleet as Eliza Gant
Arthur Hill as Ben Gant
Frances Hyland as Laura James
Joseph Bernard as Jake Clatt
Clifford Cothren as Hugh Barton
Mary Farrell as Mrs. Clatt
Julia Johnston as Mrs. Snowden
Victor Kilian as Dr. McGuire
Elizabeth Lawrence as Florry Mangle
Dwight Marfield as Mr. Farrell
Rosemary Murphy as Helen Gant Barton
Bibi Osterwald as Madame Elizabeth
Tom Flatley Reynolds as Will Pentland
Jack Sheehan as Tarkinton
Leonard Stone as Hugh Barton
Arthur Storch as Luke Gant
Florence Sundstrom as Mrs. Marie "Fatty" Pert
Susan Torrey as Miss Brown

Musical adaptation
Frings' stage adaptation of Look Homeward, Angel was readapted as a Broadway musical, Angel, which opened at the Minskoff Theatre in New York on May 4, 1978, and closed May 13 after five performances  and poor reviews. Frings co-wrote the book with the show's lyricist, Peter Udell, whose lyrics were set to music by Gary Geld. This songwriting team had created the musicals Shenandoah and Purlie and penned the hit song "Sealed with a Kiss."

Angel was directed by Philip Rose and choreographed by Robert Tucker. The production featured costumes by Pearl Somner, lighting design by John Gleason and scenery by Ming Cho Lee.

Frances Sternhagen received a nomination for the 1978 Tony Award for Best Leading Actress in a Musical, and Joel Higgins was nominated for a 1978 Drama Desk Award for Outstanding Featured Actor in a Musical.

References

External links
 

1957 plays
Broadway plays
Fiction set in 1916
Plays based on novels
Plays by Ketti Frings
Plays set in North Carolina
Plays set in the 1910s
Pulitzer Prize for Drama-winning works
Thomas Wolfe